Luis Abanto Morales (25 August 1923 – 14 June 2017) was a Peruvian singer and composer.

Born in Trujillo, Peru, his childhood was spent in Cajabamba where, after his father died, he was cared for by his paternal grandmother. His early studies were at the 113 school.

When Abanto was 13 years old his mother, doña Rosa, brought him to Lima, and they moved to the Tingüa passage in the District of Lince. From a young age Abanto had to support his family. There he would work at day and study at night.  Later he took electricity training in the Salesians Catholic School. 

His career began in 1942 when he won the "Districts Song" contest sponsored by Radio Callao. Later, Abanto became a famous singer and composer of traditional Peruvian music. Some of his songs carry a strong message about social conflicts and national identity, and  others about love and life. Perhaps his most famous songs are "Cholo soy", "Heaven Serrano", "La Pitita", "Love me", among others. He regularly travels to Brazil, the United States and some European countries, where the Peruvian expatriates keep requesting his presence. 
 
Morales was one of the first converts to the Church of Jesus Christ of Latter-day Saints in Peru.

Discography
 Cholo
 Nunca podrán
 Payaso
 Trujillano

References

External links
 
 "Cholo Soy" with images from a documentary about Atahualpa (subtitles), YouTube, 2008

1923 births
2017 deaths
People from Trujillo, Peru
Peruvian singer-songwriters
20th-century Peruvian male singers
20th-century Peruvian singers
Peruvian Latter Day Saints
Converts to Mormonism